Parliamentary elections were held in Norway in 1817. As political parties were not officially established until 1884, all those elected were independents.

Results

References

General elections in Norway
19th-century elections in Norway
Norway
Parliamentary